Redouane Bachiri (born October 27, 1982 in Maghnia) is an Algerian football player. He most recently played for Olympique Médéa.

External links
DZFoot Profile

1982 births
Living people
People from Maghnia
Algerian footballers
Algerian Ligue Professionnelle 1 players
ASM Oran players
IRB Maghnia players
JSM Béjaïa players
MC Oran players
USM Blida players
WA Tlemcen players
MC Alger players
USM Bel Abbès players
Association football defenders
21st-century Algerian people